The 2003 Six Nations Championship was the fourth series of the rugby union Six Nations Championship, and the 109th international championship overall. The annual tournament was won by England, who completed a grand slam, and went on to win the 2003 Rugby World Cup later the same year. Italy won their first match with Wales (30-22), finishing in 5th place for the first time in the process.

This was the sixth time in the Championship's history, but the first time since it became the Six Nations, that two teams met in the final round with undefeated records, both England and Ireland having won their first four games, making the final match a decider for the Grand Slam. It was also the first time Ireland had been involved: and the first that was won by the away team. Wales were whitewashed, losing all five of their games, and earned themselves the wooden spoon as a result.

Participants
The teams involved were:

Squads

Table

Results

Round 1

Round 2

Round 3

Referee Pablo De Luca was injured during the match and replaced by touch judge Tony Spreadbury at half-time.

Round 4

Round 5

Red carpet incident

The deciding game between Ireland and England was overshadowed by an incident in the pre-game ceremonies in which the President of Ireland, Mary McAleese, had to walk on the grass instead of the red carpet to meet the Irish team. England had lined up on the left hand side when facing the tunnel, which was said to be Ireland's lucky side. When asked to move his team, England captain Martin Johnson refused, so Ireland lined up to the left of them, with no team now on the right hand side, leaving insufficient red carpet on that side. A day after the game the Irish Rugby Football Union sent a written apology to the president for the England team's failure to "follow established and communicated protocol", while the Rugby Football Union also sent her a "full and unreserved apology". Having dismissed it at the time as "a fuss about nothing", Johnson later explained ahead of meeting the president again in Ireland for the 2011 Championship that he had lined up on that side as it was customary to line up on the side you warmed up on, that he had no prior knowledge of the protocol, and his subsequent refusal to move was because the request came from some "random guy", rather than the match referee.

References 

 
2003 rugby union tournaments for national teams
2003
2002–03 in European rugby union
2002–03 in Irish rugby union
2002–03 in English rugby union
2002–03 in Welsh rugby union
2002–03 in Scottish rugby union
2002–03 in French rugby union
2002–03 in Italian rugby union
February 2003 sports events in Europe
March 2003 sports events in Europe